The 1902–03 season was Manchester United's 11th season in the Football League, and their first season under their new name of "Manchester United", as opposed to "Newton Heath".

Second Division

FA Cup

References

Manchester United F.C. seasons
Manchester United